Thorn: Digital Defenders of Children, previously known as DNA Foundation, is an international anti-human trafficking organization that works to address the sexual exploitation of children. The primary programming efforts of the organization focus on Internet technology and the role it plays in facilitating child pornography and sexual slavery of children on a global scale. The organization was founded by American actors Demi Moore and Ashton Kutcher.

History 
DNA Foundation was founded in 2009, by film and television actors Demi Moore and Ashton Kutcher. At that time, Moore was viewing an MSNBC documentary on human trafficking and sexual slavery of children in Cambodia. While later researching some of the issues that were presented in the film, she was inspired to act when she learned that child pornography and the sexual slavery of children were taking place not only in Cambodia, but in the United States as well.

When DNA Foundation was established, the name of the organization represented the couple, along with their joint commitment to addressing human trafficking. On November 15, 2012, the name of the organization was changed following the dissolution of the founders' marriage. , they remain with the organization as co-founders. The members of the board of directors of Thorn include Moore and Kutcher; as well as Ray Chambers, the United Nations Secretary-General's Special Envoy for Malaria; and Jim Pitkow, co-founder of Attributor.

Programming 
Thorn works with a group of technology partners who serve the organization as members of the Technology Task Force. The goal of the program includes developing technological barriers and initiatives to ensure the safety of children online and deter sexual predators on the Internet. Various corporate members of the task force include Facebook, Google, Irdeto, Microsoft, Mozilla, Palantir, Salesforce Foundation, Symantec, and Twitter.

Following the organizational change in November 2012, Kutcher and Moore made the following statement regarding the overall focus on technology:
For the past three years we have focused our work broadly on combating child sex trafficking. It has become crystal clear in our efforts that technology plays an increasingly large role in this crime and in the sexual exploitation of children overall. We believe that the technology-driven aspect of these crimes demands its own attention and investment.
As of July 2013, Thorn is in talks with leading internet companies (Facebook, Microsoft, Google, Twitter and at least three others) to collaborate on creating a database of millions of child abuse images on the web.

Corporate partners 
Organizations that partner with Thorn in addressing child sex slavery include Polaris Project, Girls Educational and Mentoring Services, the National Center for Missing & Exploited Children.

Thorn has partnered with the McCain Institute.

Notable supporters 
The following are notable individuals from the film, television, and sports industries that support the work and mission of Thorn.

References

External links 
 

International human rights organizations
Children's rights organizations in the United States
Organizations that combat human trafficking